Air Link Pty Ltd is an airline and air charter company based in Dubbo, New South Wales, Australia. It operates air charter services and recommenced regular passenger services in November 2019. Its main base is Dubbo Airport.

History 

The airline was formed and started operations in 1974 as an aircraft charter operation based in Dubbo. In 1989 the company was acquired by David and Barbara Miller. Regular regional airline services across western New South Wales were commenced in 1991, when Hazelton Airlines divested itself of its piston-engined aircraft and the routes served by those aircraft. On 30 November 2005 Regional Express Holdings  acquired all the shares in Air Link, with David Miller appointed as Chief Executive, and it was run as an independent airline within the Regional Express group. On 10 November 2008 Regional Express Holdings announced that Air Link would cease all scheduled operations on 20 December and concentrate on its air charter and aircraft maintenance business. Scheduled services resumed again in 2014 with a daily return service between Dubbo and Sydney operated on behalf of Regional Express Airlines. In 2015, services commenced to Cobar in the company's Beech 1900D and in December 2017 Air Link ceased these flights. At the start of 2018 the company ceased all RPT operations for Regional Express, with the sole remaining Beech 1900D being sold in March and soon after suspended all charter flights. In September 2018, Regional Express Holdings sold the Air Link business to Aviation Logistics Holdings. From November 2019, Air Link recommenced regular passenger services with flights to Bourke, Lightning Ridge and Walgett using its Piper Chieftain fleet. From 2019, the fleet has been progressively refurbished, particularly to incorporate the company's new stylized logo.

Destinations 

Prior to the cessation of scheduled services in December 2008, Air Link operated to the following destinations:

 Bathurst
 Bourke
 Cobar
 Coonamble
 Lightning Ridge
 Mudgee
 Sydney
 Walgett

Prior to the second cessation of scheduled services, Air Link operated to the following destinations on behalf of Regional Express Airlines:

 Cobar
 Dubbo
 Sydney

Destinations from the recommencement of services in November 2019:
 Bourke
 Lightning Ridge
 Walgett

Fleet 
As of 2018 the Air Link fleet consists of the following aircraft:

2 Cessna 310R
3 Piper PA-31-350 Chieftain
3 Cessna Citation Mustang
2 Cessna Citation Mustang (Medical)
1 Beechcraft King Air
1 Beechcraft Baron

Formerly operated
 Beechcraft 1900D

References

External links

Air Link

Regional Aviation Association of Australia
Airlines of Australia
Airlines established in 1971
Australian companies established in 1971
Companies based in New South Wales
Dubbo
Transport in New South Wales